Gopalganj Lok Sabha constituency is one of the 40 Lok Sabha constituencies in Bihar state in eastern India. It has been reserved for Scheduled Castes.

Assembly segments
Presently, Gopalganj Lok Sabha constituency comprises the following six Vidhan Sabha (legislative assembly) segments:

Members of Parliament

Elections results

See also
 Gopalganj district
 List of Constituencies of the Lok Sabha

References

External links
Gopalganj lok sabha  constituency election 2019 result details

Lok Sabha constituencies in Bihar
Politics of Gopalganj district, India